The 2018 Collegiate Rugby Championship was a college rugby sevens tournament played June 1–3 at Talen Energy Stadium in Chester, Pennsylvania, a suburb of Philadelphia. It was the ninth annual Collegiate Rugby Championship, and the eight consecutive year that the tournament was at Talen Energy Stadium (formerly known as PPL Park). The event was broadcast on ESPN+, ESPN2 and ESPNews. The men's tournament consisted of 24 teams split into six pools. Lindenwood won both the men's and women's championships. To claim their first title in only their second appearance in the tournament, Lindenwood defeated UCLA in the men's final. Total attendance for the three day tournament was 27,002 including a record setting 15,109 for Saturday pool play.

Pool stage

Pool A

Pool B

Pool C

Pool D

Pool E

Pool F

Knockout stage

Bowl

Plate

Cup

Players

Most Valuable Player
Mark Dombroski

Freedom Cup
With their 2018 Freedom Cup victory, Fordham qualified for the CRC Championship top division in 2019.

References 

2018
2018 rugby union tournaments for clubs
2018 in American rugby union
2018 rugby sevens competitions
2018 in sports in Pennsylvania
Collegiate Rugby